
Gmina Kłodzko is a rural gmina (administrative district) in Kłodzko County, Lower Silesian Voivodeship, in south-western Poland. Its seat is the town of Kłodzko, although the town is not part of the territory of the gmina.

Neighbouring gminas
Gmina Kłodzko is bordered by the towns of Kłodzko and Polanica-Zdrój, and the gminas of Bardo, Bystrzyca Kłodzka, Lądek-Zdrój, Nowa Ruda, Radków, Stoszowice, Szczytna and Złoty Stok.

Villages
The gmina contains the villages of Bierkowice, Boguszyn, Droszków, Gołogłowy, Gorzuchów, Jaszkowa Dolna, Jaszkowa Górna, Jaszkówka, Kamieniec, Korytów, Krosnowice, Łączna, Ławica, Marcinów, Mikowice, Młynów, Morzyszów, Ołdrzychowice Kłodzkie, Piszkowice, Podtynie, Podzamek, Rogówek, Romanowo, Roszyce, Ruszowice, Ścinawica, Starków, Stary Wielisław, Święcko, Szalejów Dolny, Szalejów Górny, Wilcza, Wojbórz, Wojciechowice and Żelazno.

Twin towns – sister cities

Gmina Kłodzko is twinned with:
 Georgsmarienhütte, Germany
 Rytro, Poland
 Zbąszyń, Poland

References

Klodzko
Kłodzko County